Mônica Angélica de Paula (born 4 April 1978), or simply Mônica, is a Brazilian footballer. She most recently played as a defender for Brazil's Botucatu FC.  She was a member of the Brazilian National Team that won the silver medal at the 2004 Summer Olympics.

Born in São Paulo, Mônica only began playing football in 1999. Before, she used to practice basketball — even played with Adrianinha and Kelly of the basketball national team — and volleyball, which she abandoned after a pregnancy. In her pro career, she also played for São Paulo, Matonense and Araraquara.

At the training camp for the 2000 Summer Olympics, Mônica fought with teammate Daniela. The confrontation was attributed to premenstrual syndrome.

References

1978 births
Living people
Monica
Monica
Monica
Footballers at the 2000 Summer Olympics
Footballers at the 2004 Summer Olympics
Olympic footballers of Brazil
Olympic silver medalists for Brazil
Olympic medalists in football
Brazil women's international footballers
Associação Ferroviária de Esportes (women) players
Medalists at the 2004 Summer Olympics
Pan American Games gold medalists for Brazil
Pan American Games medalists in football
Botucatu Futebol Clube players
Footballers at the 2003 Pan American Games
2007 FIFA Women's World Cup players
2003 FIFA Women's World Cup players
Medalists at the 2003 Pan American Games
São Paulo FC (women) players